Tserendonoin Sanjaa (7 November 1936 – 22 April 2019) was a Mongolian wrestler. He competed in the men's freestyle heavyweight at the 1964 Summer Olympics.

References

External links
 

1936 births
2019 deaths
Mongolian male sport wrestlers
Olympic wrestlers of Mongolia
Wrestlers at the 1964 Summer Olympics
Place of birth missing